A Word to the Wives is a 1955 sponsored comedy film directed by Norman Lloyd and starring Marsha Hunt and Darren McGavin.

The film, now in the public domain, was sponsored by the American Gas Association, the National Association of Home Builders, and Woman's Home Companion magazine, and features products by Caloric, Whirlpool Corporation, Formica Corporation, Republic Steel Kitchens, and Ruud.

Plot
Housewife Jane Peters is envious of her friend Alice's new ranch house. At Alice's suggestion, she decides to trick her husband, George, into buying a new kitchen.  Jane leaves her husband and son alone while she visits her mother in Cleveland.

George is completely incompetent when trying to cook for himself and his son in their aging kitchen. After Jane returns, the Peters visit Alice and her husband and find out more about the modern conveniences in their new home. George then decides that his entire home needs replacing, and he arranges to buy a new home, complete with his wife's dream kitchen.

Cast
Marsha Hunt as Alice, Jane's friend
Darren McGavin as George Peters
Janet Riley as Jane Peters
Scott McKay

See also
List of American films of 1955
 List of films in the public domain in the United States

External links
 
 

1955 films
1955 short films
Sponsored films
American comedy short films
1950s English-language films
1950s American films
1955 comedy films